Wushu was contested by both men and women at the 1998 Asian Games in Bangkok, Thailand from December 16 to December 19, 1998. It was competed in the disciplines of Taijiquan, Changquan, Nanquan and Sanda. All events were held at Thammasat Gymnasium 6. Changquan event consisted of Changquan, one long weapon discipline and one short weapon discipline.

Schedule

Medalists

Men's taolu

Men's sanda

Women's taolu

Medal table

References
 Results
 Results

External links
 Olympic Council of Asia

 
1998
1998 Asian Games events
1998 in wushu (sport)